Leo Raymond Thomas (July 26, 1923 – March 5, 2001), nicknamed "Tommy", was a third baseman in Major League Baseball. He played for the St. Louis Browns and Chicago White Sox.

References

External links

1923 births
2001 deaths
Major League Baseball third basemen
St. Louis Browns players
Chicago White Sox players
Baseball players from California
People from Turlock, California
Olean Oilers players
Portland Beavers players
Salinas Packers players
Austin Senators players
Beaumont Exporters players
Sacramento Solons players
Shreveport Sports players
Seattle Rainiers players
Spokane Indians players
Kansas City Blues (baseball) players
Fort Worth Cats players
Kingsport Dodgers players
Abilene Blue Sox players
Santa Barbara Saints players
Greenville Spinners players